Alexandria Higher Institute of Engineering and Technology (AIET) is a private institute for higher education founded in 1996 and owned by "Mohamed Ragab Foundation for Social Development" which is an organization registered with the Egyptian Government. It was named "Alexandria Institute of Technology (AIT)" till 2007 when its name was changed to "Alexandria Institute Of Engineering and Technology". It provides a bachelor's degree in engineering. Graduates can also can be a member in Egyptian Engineering Syndicate.

Undergraduate programs 
The Alexandria Institute of Technology comprises four departments:
 Electronics and Communications engineering department.
 Computer engineering department.
 Mechatronics engineering department.
 Industrial engineering department.

AIET Dean 
The dean of AIET from 1996 till 2006 was Prof Dr. Mahmoud M. Shabana. The current dean is Prof Dr. El-Sayed Abdel-Moety El-Badawy who became dean in 2007. From 1996 till 2007  Prof Dr. M.Salah El-Dein Khalil  served as the assistant dean.

AIET Continuous Learning Center 
Continuous learning center is  aimed at developing community, student & teaching assistance skills by providing helpful courses and certificates .It has been certified by UNESCO, Microsoft, Cisco and Prometric International Exams Testing Lab.
Business and Languages courses are also provided.
The center is under the supervision of:
 Dr. Ayman Shawky
 Dr.Tamer Fouad Mabrok

AIET Student Community 

AIET Student Union Contains 6 Committee including:
 Cultural Committee
 Sports Committee
 Social Committee
 Arts Committee
 Scouts Committee
 Families Committee

AIET Graduate Association 
Graduate Association was established for the graduates in 2002, it is responsible for getting jobs for the graduates and organizing graduate parties & re-union meetings.

External links
AIET Official Website
Continuous Learning Group On FaceBook
AIET Student Community Forum
AIET Computer Team
AIET Graduate Association On FaceBook
IEEE Student Branch on AIET
The Official Department Page

References

Institute of Technology
Educational institutions established in 1996
1996 establishments in Egypt
Universities in Egypt